Kirttivarman (also Kirtivarman or Kirtivarma) may refer to:

 Kirttivarman I, 6th century Chalukya ruler of south-western India
 Kirtivarman II, 8th century Chalukya ruler of south-western India
 Kirttivarman I (Chandela dynasty), 11th century Hindu Chandel  of central India
Kirttivarman II (Chandela dynasty), 15th century Hindu Chandel ruler of Central India.